The Mandan are a Native American tribe residing in North Dakota.

Mandan can also refer to:
 Mandan language
 Mandan, North Dakota, town in North Dakota
 Mandan, Michigan, an unincorporated community
 Mandan, Khyber Pakhtunkhwa, town in Pakistan
 Mandan (YTB-794), United States Navy harbor tug